Yohannan is a Syriac name, from the Hebrew name Yohanan, equivalent to English John, French Jehan, Spanish Juan, and German Johannes.

It may refer to:
Yohannan the Leper,  Yohannan Garba ("the Leper"), originally metropolitan of Nisibis, was anti-patriarch of the Church of the East between 691 and 693
 Yohannan I, a.k.a. Yohannan I bar Marta, patriarch of the Church of the East between 680 and 683
 Yohannan II, a.k.a. Yohannan II bar Narsai, Patriarch of the Church of the East from 884 to 891
 Yohannan III, the nephew of the patriarch Theodosius (853–858), was Patriarch of the Church of the East from 893 to 899 
 Yohannan IV, Patriarch of the Church of the East from 900 to 905
 Yohannan V, Patriarch of the Church of the East from 1000 to 1011
 Yohannan VI, a.k.a. Yohannan VI bar Nazuk, Patriarch of the Church of the East from 1012 to 1016
 Yohannan VII, a.k.a. Yohannan VII bar Targhal, Patriarch of the Church of the East from 1049 to 1057
 Yohannan VIII Hormizd, a.k.a. John Hormez or Hanna Hormizd, Patriarch of the Chaldean Catholic Church (d. 1830)
 Yohannan, Metropolitan of India ( 1490–1504)
 K. P. Yohannan (born 1950), founder and president of Gospel for Asia; the Metropolitan of Believers Church
 T. C. Yohannan (born 1947), Indian long jumper
 Tim Yohannan (1945–1998), founder of Maximum Rocknroll, a radio show and fanzine documenting punk subculture

See also
 John (given name)
 Yohanna (name)
 Yohanan (name)